Elke Wölfling (born 27 November 1971) is a retired Austrian athlete who specialised in the sprint hurdles. She represented her country at three indoor World Championships. Her best outing was the seventh place at the 2000 European Indoor Championships.

Her personal bests are 13.09 seconds in the 100 metres hurdles (+1.3 m/s, Wolfsberg 2003) and 8.16 seconds in the 60 metres hurdles (Linz 2003).

Competition record

References

External links
Personal site

1971 births
Living people
Austrian female hurdlers